Grem is a village in Nawabganj of Bareilly district, in Uttar Pradesh, India.

As per constitution of India and Panchyati Raaj Act, Grem village is administered by Sarpanch (Head of Village) who is elected representative of village.

References

Villages in Bareilly district